The Shot was a basketball play that occurred during a 1989 playoff game between the Chicago Bulls and Cleveland Cavaliers of the National Basketball Association (NBA). It took place on May 7, 1989 at Richfield Coliseum in Richfield Township, Ohio, during the deciding Game 5 of the Eastern Conference First Round series between the Bulls and Cavaliers. With the best-of-five series tied at two games apiece and the Cavaliers leading the game by one point with three seconds left, Bulls player Michael Jordan received an inbound pass and made a buzzer-beater shot to give the Bulls a 101–100 win and clinch a series victory. The play capped off a final minute in which there were six lead changes. Jordan finished the game with 44 points. The Shot is considered to be one of his greatest clutch moments, and the game itself is regarded as a classic. 

This series was a rematch of the previous season's Eastern Conference First Round series, which the Bulls won 3-2. However, in 1989, Cleveland swept all six regular-season games against Chicago, including a 90–84 victory in the final regular-season game in which they rested their four best players (Ron Harper, Mark Price, Brad Daugherty and Larry Nance). The Cavaliers were the third seed in the Eastern Conference and the Bulls were the sixth seed; this was a reversal of the previous year's playoff seeding, in which the Bulls were the third seed and the Cavaliers the sixth seed. Cleveland had a 57–25 regular season record, tied with the Los Angeles Lakers for the second-best record in the league behind the Detroit Pistons. Chicago's regular season record that year was 47–35 which, although it placed them fifth in their division, was good enough for the sixth playoff seed in the conference. Given both these factors, the Bulls' playoff victory was considered a major upset. In retrospect, The Shot symbolized the beginning of the ascent of the Jordan-led Chicago Bulls. It was the first of many game-winning shots that Jordan made in his playoff career; on Game 4 of the 1993 Eastern Conference Semifinals, Jordan made another series-winning buzzer-beater on the same end of the court in the same building, to give the Bulls their fourth playoff series win over the Cavaliers, this series being a four-game sweep.

The Play

Michael Jordan made a jump shot with 6 seconds left to give the Bulls a 99–98 lead. After Cleveland called a timeout, Craig Ehlo inbounded the ball to Larry Nance, who gave the ball back to Ehlo, who scored on a driving layup to give Cleveland a 100–99 lead with 3 seconds left. Chicago then called timeout. Jordan was double-teamed by Ehlo and Nance on the inbounds. Jordan first moved to his right, pushing Nance away, then cut left to get open and receive the inbound pass from Brad Sellers. Drifting to his left, Jordan made a jump shot at the foul line hanging in the air over the defending Ehlo who leaped to block the shot as time expired, giving the Bulls a 101–100 victory.

Lasting image
The lasting image of the moment is Jordan's wild, emphatic celebration: a leap into the air and multiple fist pumps as Ehlo fell to the ground in despair a short distance away. This scene has become part of many fans' recollection of The Shot, but it was not shown to viewers of the televised game (which was broadcast on CBS with Dick Stockton and Hubie Brown as well as sideline reporter James Brown calling the action). CBS never aired this replay during the game telecast, nor was Jordan's celebration caught by the sideline pressbox camera used for most game action. Instead, fans saw the celebration of Bulls head coach Doug Collins, who ran around Bulls assistant coach Phil Jackson and into the arms of his team.

Jordan's leap was recreated for the 2006 television commercial "Second Generation".

Jim Durham's call of "The Shot" was used on the opening billboard of the NBA on NBC throughout the 1990–91 NBA season.

This was the first buzzer beater to occur in a winner-take-all playoff game. A game-winning shot like this would not happen again until 2019, when the Toronto Raptors' Kawhi Leonard scored a Game 7 shot which bounced off the rim four times before falling.

Commentary

Bulls' Radio Network

CBS

Cavaliers Radio Network

See also
Cleveland sports curse

References

External links
The Shot at nba.com/history

Shot
1989 in sports in Ohio
Chicago Bulls games
Cleveland Cavaliers games
Michael Jordan
National Basketball Association playoff games
Basketball in Cleveland
May 1989 sports events in the United States